Iphiseiodes is a genus of mites in the Phytoseiidae family.

Species
 Iphiseiodes kamahorae De Leon, 1966
 Iphiseiodes metapodalis (El-Banhawy, 1984)
 Iphiseiodes neonobilis Denmark & Muma, 1978
 Iphiseiodes nobilis (Chant & Baker, 1965)
 Iphiseiodes quadripilis (Banks, 1904)
 Iphiseiodes setillus Gondim Jr. & Moraes, 2001
 Iphiseiodes zuluagai Denmark & Muma, 1972

References

Phytoseiidae